Radim Rulík (born June 10, 1965 in Ostrov, Czechoslovakia) is a Czech ice hockey coach. He is currently the head coach of the BK Mladá Boleslav of the Czech Extraliga.

Coaching career
Rulík's coaching career began as an assistant coach for the HC Karlovy Vary in 1991. Then he was also an assistant coach for the HC Plzeň, Avangard Omsk and the Czech Republic national junior team. He was an assistant coach of the Czech Republic national team alongside Vladimír Růžička at the 2004 World Cup of Hockey and the 2005 IIHF World Championship where they won gold medals. He debuted first time as a head coach for the HC Karlovy Vary in the 2004–05 season. He was first and only head coach of the KHL club HC Lev Poprad.

External links

1965 births
Czech ice hockey coaches
Czechoslovak ice hockey coaches
Living people
People from Ostrov (Karlovy Vary District)
Sportspeople from the Karlovy Vary Region